Portrait of Jan Six is a 1647 etching by Rembrandt, known in five states. It shows Jan Six, also the subject of a painted portrait by the same artist.

Adam von Bartsch assigned the etching the number B. 285. Impressions of it are in the British Museum, Hermitage Museum and Rijksmuseum.

External links
http://www.britishmuseum.org/research/collection_online/collection_object_details.aspx?objectId=757100&partId=1&searchText=rembrandt+sketches&page=1
https://www.rijksmuseum.nl/en/collection/RP-P-1987-206

1647 works
17th-century etchings
Six
Six
Prints by Rembrandt
Collection of the Hermitage Museum
Prints and drawings in the British Museum
Prints of the Rijksmuseum Amsterdam